Avrim Blum (born 27 May 1966) is a computer scientist.  In 2007, he was made a Fellow of the Association for Computing Machinery "for contributions to learning theory and algorithms." Blum attended MIT, where he received his Ph.D. in 1991 under professor Ron Rivest. He was a professor of computer science at Carnegie Mellon University from 1991 to 2017.

In 2017, he joined Toyota Technological Institute at Chicago as professor and chief academic officer.

His main work has been in the area of theoretical computer science, with particular activity in the fields of machine learning, computational learning theory, algorithmic game theory, database privacy, and algorithms.

Avrim is the son of two other well-known computer scientists, Manuel Blum, 1995 Turing Award winner, and Lenore Blum.

Bibliography
 Blum, Avrim, John Hopcroft, and Ravindran Kannan. "Foundations of Data Science," February 27, 2020. https://home.ttic.edu/~avrim/book.pdf.

See also

 Co-training

References

External links
 Videos of Avrim lecturing
 Avrim Blum's homepage at the Toyota Technological Institute at Chicago
 Avrim Blum's homepage at Carnegie Mellon University

1966 births
Carnegie Mellon University faculty
Fellows of the Association for Computing Machinery
American computer scientists
Theoretical computer scientists
Living people
Massachusetts Institute of Technology alumni